Meyer may refer to:

People
Meyer (surname), listing people so named
Meyer (name), a list of people and fictional characters with the name

Companies
 Meyer Burger, a Swiss mechanical engineering company
 Meyer Corporation
 Meyer Sound Laboratories
 Meyer Turku, a Finnish shipbuilding company
 Behn Meyer, a German chemical company 
 Fred Meyer, an American hypermarket chain and subsidiary of Kroger
 Fred Meyer Jewelers

Places

United States
 Meyer, Illinois, an unincorporated community in Adams County, Illinois
 Meyer, Franklin County, Illinois, an unincorporated community in Franklin County, Illinois
 Meyer, Iowa, in Mitchell County, Iowa
 Myers, Montana (also spelled Meyer), an unincorporated community in Treasure County
 Meyer Township, Michigan

Other
 Meyer House (disambiguation), multiple buildings in the U.S.
 Meyer locomotive
 Meyer Theatre, an historic theater in Wisconsin, U.S.
 USS Meyer (DD-279), a Clemson-class destroyer in the United States Navy

See also 
 Justice Meyer (disambiguation)
 Von Meyer
 Myer (disambiguation)
 Meyr (disambiguation)
 Meier
 Meijer (surname)
 Meir (disambiguation)
 Mair (disambiguation)
 Mayer (disambiguation)
 Maier
 Mayr
 Meyers
 Myers